Justin Ospelt (born 7 September 1999) is a professional footballer who plays as a goalkeeper for Austrian Second League club FC Dornbirn, on loan from Swiss Challenge League club FC Vaduz. Born in the Bahamas, Ospelt represents the Liechtenstein national team.

Early life
Ospelt was born Nassau, Bahamas to Rhonda (née Wilson) and Armin Ospelt. His father is Liechtensteiner and his mother is Afro-Bahamian.

Club career 
After joining Vaduz in July 2017, Ospelt signed an extension in January 2021. Ospelt joined Regionalliga side KFC Uerdingen 05 in the summer of 2021. However, he injured a muscle in his knee during his debut for Uerdingen, and had to have surgery. He was sent on another loan on 13 June 2022, joining Austrian Second League club FC Dornbirn.

International career 
Ospelt made his international debut for the Liechtenstein national team on 7 October 2020 in a friendly match against Luxembourg.

Career statistics

International

References

External links
 
 

1999 births
Living people
Sportspeople from Nassau, Bahamas
People with acquired Liechtenstein citizenship
Liechtenstein footballers
Bahamian footballers
Liechtenstein people of Bahamian descent
Bahamian people of Liechtenstein descent
Association football goalkeepers
Liechtenstein youth international footballers
Liechtenstein under-21 international footballers
Liechtenstein international footballers
Swiss Challenge League players
Regionalliga players
2. Liga (Austria) players
FC Vaduz players
KFC Uerdingen 05 players
FC Dornbirn 1913 players
Liechtenstein expatriate footballers
Liechtenstein expatriate sportspeople in Germany
Expatriate footballers in Germany
Liechtenstein expatriate sportspeople in Austria
Expatriate footballers in Austria